A Dictionary of Arts and Sciences was published in London in 1806–7. It was originally supposed to be edited by Dr. George Gregory, Prebendary of St. Paul's. However, Gregory was too involved in his clerical affairs, so most of the material was written by an anonymous hack writer, Jeremiah Joyce. As it would turn out, another encyclopedia meant to compete with the Dictionary, the British Encyclopedia, or Dictionary of Arts and Sciences which was supposedly edited by William Nicholson, was also written mostly by an anonymous hack writer, who turned out to be the same man.

The Dictionary itself was published in response to the Pantologia.

References

External links 
A Dictionary of Arts and Sciences 3 volumes (2 text; 1 plates); London: Printed for R. Phillips, 1806-1807
A dictionary of arts and sciences Philadelphia : Published by Isaac Peirce 1815 First American ed. Vol. II
A dictionary of arts and sciences Philadelphia : Published by Isaac Peirce 1815 First American ed. Vol. III
A dictionary of arts and sciences New-York : Published for W.T. Robinson by Collins & Co., 1821–1822. 2nd American, from the last London ed., considerably improved and augm.

1806 non-fiction books
19th-century encyclopedias
English-language encyclopedias
British encyclopedias